Sant Mori is a municipality in the comarca of Alt Empordà, Girona, Catalonia, Spain.

Situated on the right bank of the river Fluvià, it is limited on the north by Sant Miquel de Fluvià, on the east by Ventalló, on the south by Saus and on the west by Palau de Santa Eulàlia.

The economy is primarily based on agriculture, animal husbandry, and, more recently, tourism.

Sant Mori was a barony in the 15th century and in 1893 it became a marquisate. The regent queen Juana Enríquez and her son Ferdinand II of Aragon spent some days in the castle of Sant Mori at the height of the war against John II of Aragon. There the Parliament of the Corts Catalanes were invoked in October, 1466.

Places of interest
 Saint Mauricio's Church. 18th century
 Sant Julià's Church. Pre-Romanic style
 Sant Mori Castle, Which is more similar to a palace than to a fortification, and is built on top of older ruins. www.castellsantmori.com/
 Archeological site of an Iberian village.

References

External links
 Government data pages 

Municipalities in Alt Empordà
Populated places in Alt Empordà